Miljkovići is a populated settlement in the Mostar municipality, Herzegovina-Neretva Canton, Federation of Bosnia and Herzegovina, Bosnia and Herzegovina. It is situated southwest of the city of Mostar.

Demographics
According to the 2013 census, its population was 294.

References

Populated places in Mostar
Villages in the Federation of Bosnia and Herzegovina